"Fire and the Flood" is a song by Australian singer-songwriter Vance Joy, and released on 24 July 2015 as the first single from deluxe edition (and fourth overall) of his debut studio album Dream Your Life Away (2014). It was also featured in the Warner Bros CGI-animated film Storks.

Background
Joy wrote the song in February 2015 and recorded it in Los Angeles. Joy explains; "There was a couple of moments when the song started coming together. I wrote this guitar riff that ended up being the line that the horns play and just a few lyrics that were rolling around in my head... When we were recording it, it feels like an epic song so we may as well treat it that way."

Music video
The music video was directed by Hayley Young and released on 22 July 2015.

The video features Joy staring down the barrel of the camera while some dramatic scenes unfold in the background.

The song was used by the Country Fire Authority in 2020 for a short video 'Skilled and Ready' celebrating the volunteer fire and emergency response agency.

Track listing

Charts

Weekly charts

Year-end charts

Certifications

References

2015 singles
2015 songs
Vance Joy songs
Songs written by Benny Blanco
Songs written by Vance Joy